Buckhart may refer to:

Buckhart, Illinois, an unincorporated community in Sangamon County
Buckhart, Missouri, an unincorporated community in Douglas County